Nicrophorus sausai is a burying beetle described by Jan Růžička, Jirí Háva and J. Schneider in 2000. It is known from Laos and northeastern India.

References

Silphidae
Beetles of Asia
Beetles described in 2000